The Elrhaz Formation is a geological formation in Niger, West Africa.

Its strata date back to the Early Cretaceous, about 125 to 112 million years ago. Dinosaur remains are among the fossils that have been recovered from the formation, alongside those of multiple species of crocodyliformes.

Gadoufaoua 
 
Gadoufaoua (Tuareg for "the place where camels fear to go") is a site within the Elrhaz Formation (located at ) in the Tenere desert of Niger known for its extensive fossil graveyard. It is where remains of Sarcosuchus imperator, popularly known as SuperCroc, were found (by Paul Sereno in 1997, for example), including vertebrae, limb bones, armor plates, jaws, and a nearly complete  skull.

Gadoufaoua is very hot and dry.  However, it is supposed that millions of years ago, Gadoufaoua had trees, plants and wide rivers.  The river covered the remains of dead animals, the fossilized remains of which were protected by the drying rivers over millions of years.

Vertebrate paleofauna

Chondrichthyes

Sarcopterygii 
{| class="wikitable"
! colspan="5" |Sarcopterygii
|-
! Genus !! Species !! Material !! Notes !! Images
|-
|Mawsonia
|M. tegamensis
|
|
|
|-
|Neoceratodus
|N. africanus
|Tooth plates.
|Dipnomorph fish. Originally described as Ceratodus africanus, assigned to Neoceratodus by M. Martin, 1982.
|
|-
|Asiatoceratodus
|A. tiguidiensis
|
|Dipnomorph fish. Originally described as Ceratodus tiguidiensis, assigned to Arganodus by M. Martin (1984) and reassigned by Kemp (1998) to the genus Asiatoceratodus.
|
|}

 Actinopterygii 

 Testudines 

 Crocodyliformes 

 Ornithischians 

 Theropods 

 Sauropods 

 See also 
 List of dinosaur-bearing rock formations
 Crato Formation
 Romualdo Formation

 References 

 Bibliography 
  
 
  

 Further reading 
 P. M. Galton and P. Taquet. 1982. Valdosaurus, a hypsilophodontid dinosaur from the Lower Cretaceous of Europe and Africa. Géobios 15(2):147-159
 H. C. E. Larsson and B. Gado. 2000. A new Early Cretaceous crocodyliform from Niger. Neues Jahrbuch für Geologie und Paläontologie - Abhandlungen 217(1):131-141
 P. C. Sereno and S. J. ElShafie. 2013. A New Long-Necked Turtle, Laganemys tenerensis'' (Pleurodira: Araripemydidae), from the Elrhaz Formation (Aptian–Albian) of Niger. In D. B. Brinkman, P. A. Holroyd, J. D. Gardner (eds.), Morphology and Evolution of Turtles 215-250
 P. C. Sereno and H. C. E. Larsson. 2009. Cretaceous crocodyliformes from the Sahara. ZooKeys 28:1-143
 P. C. Sereno, A. L. Beck, D. B. Dutheil, B. Gado, H. C. E. Larsson, G. H. Lyon, J. D. Marcot, O. W. M. Rauhut, R. W. Sadleir, C. A. Sidor, D. D. Varricchio, G. P. Wilson, and J. A. Wilson. 1998. A long-snouted predatory dinosaur from Africa and the evolution of spinosaurids. Science 282:1298-1302

Geologic formations of Niger
Upper Cretaceous Series of Africa
Cretaceous Niger
Albian Stage
Sandstone formations
Fluvial deposits
Paleontology in Niger
Cretaceous paleontological sites of Africa